Puerto Muerto is a Chicago indie rock band composed of formerly married couple Tim Kelley and Christa Meyer. 

The couple broke up while in the process of writing and recording "Drumming for Pistols", released in February 2010. Critics such as Jim DeRogatis of the Chicago Sun Times hailed the album as "stunningly powerful" partly because it is emotionally grounded in the couple's demise. Both artists now have new solo projects: Christa Meyer's band is called Man is Man, and Tim Kelley is now recording as Moss Garvey.

Discography

Albums
 2003 - Your Bloated Corpse Has Washed Ashore
 2004 - See You in Hell
 2005 - Songs of Muerto County 2005 - Songs of Muerto County Revisited 2006 - Chamber Music (James Joyce) 2008 - I Was a Swallow 2010 - Drumming For PistolsSingles
 2004 - "Crimson Beauty"
 2004 - "San Pedro/Sorrow"
 2004 - "Stars"
 2007 - "What Have I Done

EPs
 2003 - Elena 2007 - Heaven & Dirt''

References

External links
 Puerto Muerto page at Firerecords (from the Wayback Machine)
 

American indie rock groups